A roller-cone bit is a drill bit used for drilling through rock, for example when drilling for oil and gas.

Characteristics 
Drilling bits are attachments that are added to the end of a drillstring to perform the cutting necessary to penetrate the many rock layers between Earth's surface and oil/gas reservoirs. Once a hole is drilled, appropriate casings may be inserted to seal the wellbore formation.

Howard R. Hughes Sr. designed and patented the first roller-cone bit in 1909. His design had two rotating cones, but was evolved to a tricone bit (see image above) in the 1930s.

The bits are sub divided into different categories depending on the drilling process, including the type of formation being drilled and the operating conditions anticipated. There are two main categories: roller-cone bits and fixed-cutter bits. Roller-Cone bits are composed of rotating disks called cones. Rock hardness is one of the determining factors taken into account when selecting an appropriate drill bit. The cutting structure of the bits varies according to the rock formation. Softer formations are drilled with a roller-cone bit with widely spaced, long protruding teeth. Whereas harder formations are drilled with closer-spaced and shorter-toothed bits. Roller-Cone bits are versatile and can cut through many formation types.

Soft rock formations include unconsolidated sands, clays, soft limestones, redbeds and shale.  Medium formations include dolomites, limestones, and hard shale, while hard formations include hard shale, mudstones, cherty limestones and hard and abrasive formations.

The bits are further classified based on their internal bearings.  Each bit has three rotating cones and each one will rotate on its own axis during drilling.  While the bits are fixed to the drilling rigs, the rotation of the drill pipe will be in a clockwise direction and the roller cones are rotated in an anti-clockwise direction. Each roller cone is rotated on its own axis with the help of the bearing.  Again, the bearings are classified mainly into three types: Open bearing bits, Sealed Bearing Bits and Journal Bearing bits.

External links

References 

Mining equipment